A tholos (pl. tholoi), from Ancient Greek θόλος, meaning "dome"), in Latin tholus (pl. tholi), is an architectural feature that was widely used in the classical world. It is a round structure, usually built upon a couple of steps (a podium), with a ring of columns supporting a domed roof.

It is not to be confused with the tholos tombs (or "beehive tombs") of Late Bronze Age Greece.

Classical world

Greece
In Greece, the tholos is a round temple of Greek peripteral design completely encircled by a colonnade. A famous tholos can be seen in Delphi, the Tholos of Delphi. It has been dated to 370–360 BC. Its role remains unclear.

The Philippeion in the Altis of Olympia was an Ionic circular memorial in limestone and marble, a tholos, which contained chryselephantine (ivory and gold) statues of Philip's family; himself, Alexander the Great, Olympias, Amyntas III and Eurydice I.

Italy

In Roman cities they could often be found in the center of the macellum (market), where they might have been where fish were sold. Other uses for the central tholos have been suggested, such as the place where official weights and measures were held for reference or as shrines to the gods of the market place. Some macella had a water fountain or water feature in the centre of their courtyard instead of a tholos structure.

India

Some of the earliest free-standing temples in India are thought to have been of a circular type, as the Bairat Temple in Bairat, Rajasthan, formed of a central stupa surrounded by a circular colonnade and an enclosing wall, built during the time of Emperor Ashoka and near which were found several Minor Rock Edicts. Ashoka also built the Mahabodhi Temple in Bodh Gaya circa 250 BCE, also a circular structure, in order to protect the Bodhi tree. Representations of this early temple structure are found on a 100 BCE relief from the stupa railing at Bhārhut, as well as in Sanchi. These circular-type temples were also found in later rock-hewn caves such as Tulja Caves or Guntupalli. 

It has been suggested that these circular structures with colonnades may have originated with the Greek circular Tholos temple, as in the Tholos of Delphi, but circular wooden huts in India are a more likely source of inspiration.

Neo-Classical
The upper part of the US Capitol is a tholos. It houses the lighting at the very top of the Dome and serves as a base for the Statue of Freedom. The Panthéon in Paris is also topped by a tholos.

Others

References

Ancient Greek buildings and structures
Ancient Roman buildings and structures